() is the holding company of , the fifth-largest banking group in Japan as of 2012. It is headquartered in the Kiba area of Koto, Tokyo. The main operating entities of the group are Resona Bank, a nationwide corporate and retail bank headquartered in Osaka, and Saitama Resona Bank, a smaller bank headquartered in Saitama City which primarily serves Saitama Prefecture. Most of these banks' operations are descended from Daiwa Bank and Asahi Bank, which merged in 2003.

History

Daiwa Bank
Resona was formed as the Osaka Nomura Bank in 1918. This entity served as the financing arm of the Nomura zaibatsu founded by Tokushichi Nomura. Its securities brokerage operation separated in 1926 to form Nomura Securities, now Japan's largest securities company. The bank was renamed Nomura Bank in 1927 and became the main bank for the Osaka Prefecture government in 1929, immediately following the 1929 stock market crash.

The Nomura zaibatsu was dissolved in the wake of World War II, and the bank was renamed to The Daiwa Bank in 1948. It was one of the only major banks that offered both banking and trust services during the postwar era.

In 1995, a New York-based Daiwa bond trader, Toshihide Iguchi, lost $1.1 billion speculating in the bond market and was charged with forgery and falsification of bank records. The bank was criminally indicted in November 1995 and ordered to leave the U.S. market; in the wake of this incident, there were talks of a merger between Daiwa and Sumitomo Bank, which would have created the world's largest bank at the time. Daiwa closed its United States operations in 1996, and eventually pulled out of overseas banking entirely in 1998.

Asahi Bank
 was formed by a 9-bank merger in May 1945 to consolidate various savings banks that served Japanese individuals around the end of World War II. During the immediate postwar era, rapid inflation threatened the bank's business. In 1948, it was converted to an ordinary bank named .

Asahi entered into merger talks with Sanwa Bank and Tokai Bank, and the three banks announced a merger in 2001. The merger would have created the third-largest bank in the world behind Deutsche Bank and Mizuho Financial Group. However, Asahi pulled out of these talks later that year. The eventual Sanwa-Tokai merger formed UFJ Bank.

Resona merger
Daiwa formed a bank holding company, Daiwa Bank Holdings, in December 2001 to serve as the parent entity of Daiwa, Kinki Osaka Bank and Nara Bank. Later that month, Daiwa announced that Asahi Bank would be acquired by Daiwa Bank Holdings in a share swap transaction, forming the fifth-largest banking group in Japan. The company was renamed Resona Holdings, Inc. on 1 October 2002.

Daiwa and Asahi consolidated operations on 1 March 2003, with most of their assets combined to form Resona Bank. 100 Asahi Bank branches in Saitama and three branches in Tokyo were moved to a separate entity, Saitama Resona Bank.

Post-merger developments
In early 2003 the Resona Group's capital adequacy ratio fell dangerously low. The bank had proposed to maintain its capital adequacy ratio above the legal limit by factoring in deferred tax assets. However, the value of these deferred assets could only be claimed if the company turned a profit in the future. Because the bank's profit outlook was so dim, Resona's auditor refused to certify the company's financial statement if the deferred tax assets were included. Without being able to count the deferred tax assets, the bank was effectively insolvent.

The Resona case threatened to cripple the entire country's financial system, since the other major banks were also counting on deferred tax assets to maintain their capital adequacy ratios. On 17 May 2003, the Japan government decided to inject 1.96 trillion yen in public funds into the Resona Group through Resona Bank. This move, through the share exchange agreement between the bank and the holding company, effectively nationalized the bank, since the government emerged as the company's majority shareholder, holding 68.25% of voting rights of the holding company, while the holdings of existing shareholders were greatly diluted. The existing management was sacked and a new management was installed.

Former Resona Chairman Eiji Hosoya is credited with leading the bank's revival following the 2003 bailout. Hosoya initially resisted taking the appointment to head Resona, saying in a news conference held on 30 May 2003, "I decided to accept the offer as I realized that stabilizing the financial system is the highest priority for the Japanese economy." Under Hosoya, the bank's new management immediately set about to reduce Resona's non-performing loans (NPLs). In 2004, the company managed to turn a profit of ￥386 billion. As a result, Resona's management announced a plan to, over the next 10 years, return to the government ￥868 billion of the ￥3 trillion in public funds it has received. Hosoya died in November 2012.

Resona introduced two new full-time employee career tracks in 2015: one "no overtime" track for employees seeking better work-life balance, and another track for employees who wish to remain in a single position for their entire career. These policies were unique among Japanese banks at the time of their introduction.

Group companies
Resona Bank, Limited
Saitama Resona Bank, Limited
The Kinki Osaka Bank, Limited
Resona Trust & Banking Company, Limited

References

External links

Resona Holdings, Inc.

Banks established in 1918
Banks of Japan
Companies based in Osaka Prefecture
Financial services companies based in Tokyo
Holding companies based in Tokyo
Companies listed on the Tokyo Stock Exchange
Companies listed on the Osaka Exchange
Companies formerly listed on the London Stock Exchange
Government-owned companies of Japan
Companies based in Saitama Prefecture